The 2007 Season is the 21st edition of the United Soccer Leagues season.

The season kicked off on Friday, April 13 when the 2006 league runners-up Rochester Raging Rhinos traveled to the Juan Ramon Loubriel Stadium in Bayamón to take on the Puerto Rico Islanders.

General
 Two new teams join the First Division: the California Victory (San Francisco, CA), and the Carolina RailHawks (Cary, NC).
 The Virginia Beach Mariners franchise was terminated by the league.
 The Toronto Lynx depart the First Division for the Premier Development League (PDL).
 Three new teams join the Second Division: the Bermuda Hogges (Hamilton, Bermuda), the Cleveland City Stars, and Crystal Palace Baltimore.
 The Long Island Rough Riders depart the Second Division for the PDL.
 The Pittsburgh Riverhounds will be on hiatus during 2007 to reorganize.
 Many new teams join the PDL, for a complete list see here.

Honors

Standings

First Division
The schedule was not a balanced home and away affair; to make up the four extra games to total 28, each team played their four geographically closest competitors.  The playoff format was changed to qualify eight instead of six teams; therefore the first and second league champions obtained seeding to determine home field advantage instead of a first round bye as in previous seasons.  The previous bidding to host between the two playoff finalists for the one game cup final was discontinued for this season.

Playoffs

Awards and All-League Teams
First Team
F: Dan Antoniuk (Atlanta Silverbacks); Hamed Diallo (Rochester Raging Rhinos); Sebastien Le Toux (Seattle Sounders) (MVP & Co-Leading Goalscorer)
M: Stephen Armstrong (Charleston Battery); Andrew Gregor (Portland Timbers); Martin Nash (Vancouver Whitecaps); Zinho (Miami FC) 
D: Gabriel Gervais (Montreal Impact); David Hayes (Atlanta Silverbacks) (Defender of the Year); Cameron Knowles (Portland Timbers)
G: Josh Wicks (Portland Timbers) (Goalkeeper of the Year)
Coach: Gavin Wilkinson (Portland Timbers) (Coach of the Year)

Second Team
F: Charles Gbeke (Montreal Impact) (Co-Leading Goalscorer); Roger Levesque (Seattle Sounders)
M: Leonardo Di Lorenzo (Montreal Impact); Brian Farber (Minnesota Thunder); Kupono Low (Carolina RailHawks); Johnny Menyongar (Rochester Raging Rhinos)
D: Taylor Graham (Seattle Sounders); Steve Klein (Vancouver Whitecaps); Scot Thompson (Portland Timbers); Marco Velez (Puerto Rico Islanders)
G: Matt Jordan (Montreal Impact)

Second Division

Playoffs

Premier Development League
See 2007 PDL Season

See also
 United Soccer Leagues

References

External links
 Official USL Site

2
United Soccer Leagues
2007
2007